The 2017 Stony Brook Seawolves football team represented Stony Brook University in the 2017 NCAA Division I FCS football season. The Seawolves competed as fifth-year members of the Colonial Athletic Association with Chuck Priore as the head coach for his twelfth season. They played their home games at Kenneth P. LaValle Stadium in Stony Brook, New York. They finished the season 10–3, 7–1 in CAA play to finish in second place. They received an at-large bid to the FCS Playoffs where they defeated Lehigh in the first round before losing to James Madison in the second round.

Schedule

 Source: Schedule

Game summaries

at South Florida

at Rhode Island

Sacred Heart

Towson

at William & Mary

Delaware

No. 12 New Hampshire

at No. 19 Richmond

Albany

Wagner

at Maine

FCS Playoffs

Lehigh–First Round

at No. 1 James Madison–Second Round

Ranking movements

References

Stony Brook
Stony Brook Seawolves football seasons
Stony Brook
Stony Brook Seawolves football